Quintus Cervidius Scaevola (fl. 2nd century AD) was a Roman jurist of the equestrian order. Both the Historia Augusta and the Tabula Banasitana attest that Scaevola was a member of Marcus Aurelius' consilium or inner circle of advisors. Except that Papinian was his student, little more is known of Scaevola's life.

Books
Scaevola is credited with writing several works, from which excerpts have been preserved in Justinian's Digest:

 Digesta in 40 books; while books 1-29 have ample extracts, there are few from the last 10, which led Paul Jörs to suspect that part of Scaevola's Digesta had been lost by the sixth century.
 Quaestiones in 6 books.
 Responsa in 20 books.
 Quaestiones publice tractatae
 Regulae in 4 books

References

Year of birth unknown
Year of death unknown
Ancient Roman jurists
2nd-century Romans